The 3 Reconnaissance Commando was a South African special forces unit.

History 
It was established on 1 May 1976 as an administrative umbrella for various small team operations such as Delta 40 and Barnacle which were the fore-runners of the Civil Co-operation Bureau (CCB). It operated as the covert arm of Special Forces.

In April 1980, a new unit called 7 Reconnaissance Commando was formed. This unit was created to accommodate the Rhodesian soldiers who did not wish to remain in Rhodesia after majority rule. These were primarily Selous Scouts with a smattering of soldiers from other units. 120 of these soldiers and their families were housed on a new base created on the farm Schiettocht, outside Phalaborwa. They formed the nucleus of the new unit.

The name of the unit was changed from 7 to 3 Reconnaissance Commando to avoid confusion with 7 South African Infantry Battalion (7 SAI) which was also located in Phalaborwa. The Truth and Reconciliation Commission does not seem to have picked up on this distinction, getting the two units confused.

In December 1980, 5 Reconnaissance Commando moved from Dukuduku to Schiettocht and on 1 January 1981, joined forces with 3 Reconnaissance Commando to form 5 Reconnaissance Regiment.

Commanding officers
Officers commanding were:

Notes

References

External links 
 

Special forces of South Africa
Defunct organisations based in South Africa
Military units and formations of South Africa in the Border War
Military units and formations established in 1976
Military units and formations disestablished in 1980